Mujician III (August Air) is a solo album by English jazz pianist Keith Tippett. It was released on the FMP record label in 1987.

Reception
AllMusic awarded the album with 4.5 stars and its review by Thom Jurek states: 'The last – and perhaps most brilliant – part in a trilogy of solo works by British pianist and composer Keith Tippett, Mujician III is a bit of a departure from its predecessors. It has only two tracks, one a "love improvisation" to his wife, vocalist Julie Tippett ("I Love You Julie"), and the other an extended meditation on late summer ("August Air").'

Track listing 
All tracks composed by Keith Tippett.

 "I Love You, Julie" – 22:39 
 "August Air" – 47:09

Personnel 
 Keith Tippett – piano

References 

1987 albums
Keith Tippett albums